Inspirato is the fifteenth studio album by Yanni, released in 2014. To create the album, Yanni collaborated with opera tenor Plácido Domingo and producer Ric Wake to select distinguished vocalists to perform songs that Yanni had previously released over his career.

Content and production
The album's tracks are based on selected songs from throughout Yanni's career, but have newly created lyrics sung by distinguished vocalists having opera backgrounds. The dominant language of the album's lyrics is Italian. The album, with its lyrical and classical elements, was characterized as reflecting a radical change in Yanni's style. Despite the album's use of opera singers, Yanni emphasized the album was "not opera."

Yanni collaborated with tenor Plácido Domingo and producer Ric Wake to match Yanni’s songs to the respective vocalists. In part because of the distinguished vocalists' schedules, the project is said to have required four years to complete.

Contributors to album
The following individuals contributed to Inspirato (listed alphabetically).

Track listing
Inspirato includes the following tracks.

Except for the adaptation Ode À L'Humanité (Aria), all songs were written and composed by Yanni.

Production
 Produced by Yanni & Ric Wake
 All music composed by Yanni, except "Ode À L'Humanité". The song is loosely based upon a short, but beautiful part of the 19th century French opera, Lakmé, by Léo Delibes.
 Engineered by Yanni & Travis Meck
 Arranged and mixed by Yanni
 Orchestrations by Yanni & Colin O'Malley
 All music recorded at Yanni's Private Studios
 Mastered by Chris Bellman at Bernie Grundman Mastering, Los Angeles
 Executive Producers: Yanni, Plácido Domingo, Ric Wake & Don Franzen
 Art Direction & Design: Norman Moore, DesignArtLA.com
 Cover Photography: Krystal Ann
 Additional Photography: Silvio Richetto & Whit Padgett

Reception
Inspirato peaked at #1 in Billboard's Top New Age Album category for 2014 and 2015, and was Billboard's No. 11 selling New Age album of 2014.

In March 2015, Inspirato received the Best Album of the Year award from Reviews New Age (Spain).
The album's extension of Yanni's style into the lyrical and classical was characterized by Reviews New Age's Alejandro Clavijo  as being an overwhelming success.

See also
 Yanni discography
 Yanni Voices

References

External links

 
 

Yanni albums
2014 albums
Plácido Domingo albums